In baseball, batting average (AVG) is a measure of a batter's success rate in achieving a hit during an at bat. In Major League Baseball (MLB), it is calculated by dividing a player's hits by his at bats (AB). In MLB, a player in each league wins the "batting title" each season for having the highest batting average that year. The American League (AL) winner is known as the "Rod Carew American League Batting Champion", while the National League (NL) leader is designated the "Tony Gwynn National League Batting Champion". Since 1957, a player must have 3.1 plate appearances (PA) per scheduled game in that league (for a total of 502 over the current 162-game season) to qualify for the batting title. However, if a player's lead in AVG is sufficiently large that enough hitless at bats can be added to reach this requirement and the player still would have the highest batting average, he wins the title. Tony Gwynn, for example, had 159 hits in 451 ABs in 1996 (.353 average) but only 498 PAs. Gwynn's batting average would have dropped to .349 (159 hits in 455 ABs) with four hitless ABs added to reach the 502 PA requirement, but this would still have been higher than the next-highest eligible player (.344 average), so he was awarded the 1996 NL batting title.

The first batting average champion in the NL was Ross Barnes; in the league's inaugural 1876 season, Barnes batted .429 for the Chicago White Stockings. The AL was established in 1901, and Hall of Fame second baseman Nap Lajoie led that league with a .426 average for the Philadelphia Athletics. Ty Cobb of the Detroit Tigers, who also holds the highest career batting average of .366, led the AL in average in 11 (or 12) seasons. Honus Wagner and Gwynn are tied for the second-most titles, with eight apiece in the NL. It is unclear whether Lajoie or Cobb won the 1910 AL title, with some sources attributing the title to each man. If Cobb is credited with the 1910 title, he won 9 consecutive titles from 1907 to 1915 and 12 total titles for his career. Otherwise, Rogers Hornsby won the most consecutive titles, with six from 1920 to 1925. Without the 1910 title, Cobb still led the league in five consecutive seasons from 1911 to 1915. Cobb holds the record for highest average in two and three consecutive seasons (.414 from 1911 to 1912 and .408 from 1911 to 1913), but Hornsby holds the record for four and five consecutive seasons (.404 from 1922 to 1925 and .402 from 1921 to 1925). Wagner, Rod Carew, Wade Boggs, and Gwynn have each won four consecutive titles. Lajoie also had a streak of four league-leading seasons from 1901 to 1904 if he is credited with the contested AL title in 1902. At the 2016 MLB All-Star Game in San Diego, MLB announced that the AL and NL batting champions would henceforth be named in honor of Carew and Gwynn, respectively.  Gwynn won all eight titles in the NL with the San Diego Padres, while Carew was a seven-time AL batting champion.

Barnes' initial NL-leading average of .4286 in 1876 set the single-season record which stood for a decade. Tip O'Neill topped this total with a .4352 average in 1887 (that batting average had to be calculated without counting walks as hits, because of the walk-as-base-hit rule being in effect that year only), and Hugh Duffy set the current record mark in 1894 by posting a .4397 batting average. Under the current 3.1 PA qualification, players have posted a .400 batting average for a season 28 times. Ted Williams' .4057 in 1941 is the most recent such season, one of 13 to occur since 1900. George Brett in 1980 is the only player to maintain a .400 average into September since 1941. Additionally, only Brett and John Olerud in 1993 maintained such an average into August. With the modern scarcity of .400 hitters, recent players who have been above .400 early in the season, such as Chipper Jones in 2008, have drawn significant attention in the media. Brett's .390 in 1980 and Gwynn's .394 in 1994 are the only seasons in which a player reached .390 since 1941. Carl Yastrzemski's .301 in the 1968 American League was the lowest batting average ever to lead a league. Willie Keeler's 1897,Zack Wheat's 1918 and Rod Carew's 1972 are the only three title seasons in which the winner hit no home runs. Joe Mauer's 2006 title made him the first catcher to ever win an AL batting title, and his third title in 2009 surpassed Ernie Lombardi's previous record of two titles for a catcher in any league.

The closest finish in a batting race came in 1945 when Snuffy Stirnweiss batted .309, topping Tony Cuccinello's .308 average for the American League title by .00008. George Kell beat out Williams in 1949 by .00015. The closest race in the National League came in 2003 when Albert Pujols held off Todd Helton on the last day of the season by .00022. The closest National League race before that was in 1931 with Chick Hafey edging out Bill Terry by .00028. Lajoie's .426 average in 1901 was 86 points higher than runner-up Mike Donlin's .340, the largest margin of victory for a batting champion. Cap Anson's .399 in 1881 was 71 points higher than Joe Start in 1881, the widest margin in the National League.

In 2020, D.J. LeMahieu of the New York Yankees won the AL batting title, thereby becoming the first player to definitively win batting titles in both the American and National Leagues; he had also won the NL batting title in 2016 as a member of the Colorado Rockies. However, Ed Delahanty would have that distinction if he is credited with the disputed 1902 American League title, as he was also the 1899 National League champion. The only other player to win titles in multiple leagues was Pete Browning, who won American Association titles in 1882 and 1885, along with the lone Players' League championship in 1890. Barnes and Deacon White each won National Association and National League titles, but the National Association is not regarded as an official league. In addition, Oscar Charleston won batting championships in the Negro National League and Eastern Colored League.

In 1990, Willie McGee posted a .335 average over 542 at-bats in the NL before being traded to the AL on August 29. Although McGee finished the season in the AL, he had enough PA's in the NL to qualify for the NL batting title, which he won narrowly over Eddie Murray's .330. However, McGee batted .274 that season in the AL, bringing down his overall average to .324 and allowing Murray to lead the majors in batting average and not win a batting title.

Key

National League

American League

Other major leagues

Negro leagues
On December 16th, 2020, Major League Baseball announced that the records of Negro league baseball from 1920 to 1948 would be designated as major league status. As such, seven different leagues that existed in that time period are now recognized as being on the same level as MLB.  In the 28-year major league history, nine players won a league batting title multiple times: Oscar Charleston (3), Josh Gibson (3), Monte Irvin (2), Oscar Johnson (2), Buck Leonard (2), Jud Wilson (2), Artie Wilson (2), Mule Suttles (2), and Turkey Stearnes (2).

Footnotes
Recognized "major leagues" include the current American and National Leagues and several defunct leagues in the American Association, the Federal League, the Players' League, the Union Association along with seven Negro league baseball leagues: the Negro National League (1920–31), the Eastern Colored League (1923–1928), American Negro League (1929), East-West League (1932), Negro Southern League (1932), Negro National League (1933–48), and the Negro American League (1937–48)
Sources differ whether Nap Lajoie or Ed Delahanty won the American League batting title in 1902 and differ slightly over Lajoie's precise statistics that season. The Hall of Fame credits Lajoie with 129 hits in 352 at bats (.368) while MLB and Baseball-Reference.com show 133 hits in 352 at bats (.378). According to Baseball-Reference a player qualified for a batting title prior to 1920 by appearing in 60% of his team's games—82 games in the 136 game schedule in 1902—and Lajoie appeared in 87 team games. As such, Baseball-Reference credits Lajoie with the 1902 title, with Delahanty's .376 batting average placing second. MLB's historical statistics leaderboards, however, use the modern standard of 3.1 plate appearances per team game (422 in that season) which Lajoie fell 37 short of. Thus, MLB credits Delahanty with the 1902 title with his .376 average. Similarly, the Hall of Fame lists the 1902 title on Delahanty's plaque and not Lajoie's.
Before the 1910 season, Hugh Chalmers of Chalmers Automobile announced he would present a Chalmers Model 30 automobile to the player with the highest batting average at the end of the season. The 1910 race for best average in the American League was between Nap Lajoie of the Cleveland Indians and the Detroit Tigers' widely disliked Cobb. On the last day of the season, Lajoie overtook Cobb's batting average with seven bunt hits in a doubleheader against the St. Louis Browns. Browns' manager Jack O'Connor supposedly told his third baseman Red Corriden to play back down the line all day, which allowed Lajoie easy bunt hits. Cobb complained about the move, though American League President Ban Johnson said that a recalculation showed that Cobb had won the race anyway and Chalmers ultimately awarded cars to both players.
Rules in 1954 required 2.6 at bats per team game, 400 for a 154-game schedule (the rule was changed in 1957 to the current requirement of 3.1 plate appearances per team game), to qualify for the title and hitless at bats could be added to reach this total. Ted Williams posted a .345 average in 1954 over only 386 at bats, and the required hitless at bats drop him below Avila's league-leading .341 average.
While Baseball-Reference.com lists both Yelich and Marte with a batting average of .329 in 2019, Yelich's average is higher (.3292) than Marte's (.3286) if extended to four decimal places.
The major league season in 2020 was less than half the length of a typical season, starting in late July and condensed into 60 games due to the COVID-19 pandemic.
Suttles had 108 hits in 301 at-bats (.35880), while Wells had 113 hits in 315 at-bats (.35873)
Andrews played in 22 games and batted .398. However, among players with a minimum of 3.1 plate appearances / games, Baseball Reference lists Josh Gibson, who had batted .395 in 68 games, as leader among minimum qualifiers.

References

General

Specific

Batting champions
Batting champions
Batting average